Beer money is the nickname for an allowance, established in the year 1800, that was given to non-commissioned officers and soldiers in the British Army.  The practice was started at the suggestion of the Prince Frederick, Duke of York and Albany. Beer money payments were 1 penny per day and was a replacement for a daily issuance of beer or spirits while troops were on home service.  The allowance continued until 1873 when it was rolled into the soldier's daily pay.

The phrase "beer money" is still commonly used in the British Army and to a lesser extent in England as a colloquialism for personal money set aside for entertainment, such as going to a pub.

References 
 Beer money, The New International Encyclopedia, Volume II, 1912, Page 681

19th-century history of the British Army
1800 establishments in Great Britain
1873 disestablishments